Philip Murphy (born 21 November 1960) is an English former professional footballer who played as a striker.

References

1960 births
Living people
Footballers from Liverpool
English footballers
Association football forwards
Blackpool F.C. players
C.D. Nacional players
Witton Albion F.C. players
Burnley F.C. players
Workington A.F.C. players
English Football League players